The Shreveport–Bossier City metropolitan area, officially designated Shreveport–Bossier City by the U.S. Office of Management and Budget, or simply Greater Shreveport, is a metropolitan statistical area in northwestern Louisiana that covers three parishes: Caddo, Bossier, and DeSoto. At the 2020 United States census, the metropolitan region had a population of 393,406; its American Community Survey population was 397,590 per census estimates. With a 2010 census population of 439,000, it declined to become Louisiana's fourth largest metropolis at 394,706 residents at the 2019 census estimates.

Shreveport–Bossier City is the largest economic and cultural center of North Louisiana and the wider Ark-La-Tex region. The Shreveport–Bossier City metropolitan region comprises the highest concentration of colleges and universities in the Ark-La-Tex. It is part of the I-20 Cyber Corridor linking the area to Ruston, Grambling, and Monroe, Louisiana; Dallas and Tyler, Texas; and Atlanta, Georgia.

Shreveport–Bossier City's metropolitan economy is primarily based on oil and natural gas, manufacturing, casinos, restaurants, commerce, telecommunications, technology, banking, healthcare and medical research, and advertising. The largest companies operating within the metropolitan statistical area are Amazon, Calumet Specialty Products Partners, SWEPCO, AT&T Mobility and Cricket Wireless, Louisiana State University, JPMorgan Chase, Comcast, Regions Financial Corporation, Brookshire Grocery Company, and Walmart. The metropolis is one of the most religious in the United States, Shreveport being one of the top 5 most religious cities in the United States in 2016.

Geography 
The Shreveport–Bossier City metropolitan area has a total area a little over 2,699 square miles. The area is slightly larger than the U.S. state of Delaware, and smaller than Connecticut and the U.S. territory of Puerto Rico. The U.S. Office of Management and Budget defines the metropolitan region as covering Caddo, Bossier, and DeSoto parishes. Previously, Webster Parish was considered part of Greater Shreveport; it is now part of the Shreveport–Bossier City–Minden combined statistical area. Communities of the metropolis sit at elevations over 100 feet above sea level making them primary locations for coastal retreat due to rising sea levels.

The Shreveport–Bossier City area is located in the South Central United States, bordering East Texas and South Arkansas. As such, it is within the Piney Woods ecoregion. Its vegetation is classified as temperate forest and grassland. Much of the urbanized area was built on forested land, marshes, swamp, or prairie, remnants of which can still be seen throughout the metropolitan region.

Communities

Cities 
 Shreveport (Principal city)
 Bossier City (Principal city and suburb)
 Mansfield (Principal city)

Towns 

 Benton
 Blanchard (suburb)
 Greenwood (suburb)
 Haughton (suburb)
 Keachi
 Logansport
 Oil City
 Plain Dealing
 Stonewall (suburb)
 Vivian

Villages 

 Belcher
 Gilliam
 Grand Cane
 Hosston
 Ida
 Longstreet
 Mooringsport
 Rodessa
South Mansfield
 Stanley

Unincorporated communities 

 Eastwood (census-designated place and suburb)
 Frierson (census-designated place)
 Gloster (census-designated place)
 Keithville (suburb)
 Kingston
 Lakeview (census-designated place and suburb)
 Red Chute (census-designated place and suburb)

Demographics 

At the 2010 United States census, there were 557,201 people, 189,000 households, and 139,000 families residing within the metropolitan statistical area; in 2020, the United States census determined it had a population of 393,406. The American Community Survey's 2020 census estimates postulated a rebound of 397,590.

According to census estimates from 2015 to 2020, approximately 156,594 households were in the metropolitan area with an average of 2.5 people per household; 46% of the household were married, and spread among 184,148 housing units of which 85% were occupied. Of the housing units, 63% were owner-occupied and 71% were single-unit detached homes at a median value of $156,900. Residents in the metropolitan statistical area had a median household income of $46,610 and 20.9% of its population lived at or below the poverty line.

At the 2010 census, the racial and ethnic makeup of Shreveport–Bossier City was 60.58% White, 28.74% African American, 1.02% Native American, 1.88% Asian, 0.14% Pacific Islander, 0.80% from other races, 1.22% from two or more races, and 6.08% Hispanic or Latino of any heritage. According to 2020 census estimates, 52% of its population were White Americans, and 40% were Black or African American. Hispanic or Latino Americans of any race were 4% of the total metropolitan population, rebounding from previous census estimates after declining since the 2010 census.

In 2020 according to Sperling's BestPlaces, roughly 63.5% of Shreveport–Bossier City was religious. The city of Shreveport was ranked one of the most religious cities in the U.S. in 2016 through another study. According to the Association of Religion Data Archives in 2020, it remained one of the most Christian areas of the United States. Per Sperling's, the largest religion in the metropolitan statistical area is Christianity, followed by Islam, Judaism, and eastern religions including Buddhism, Sikhism, and Hinduism. There is also a growing spiritual but not religious community. 

Among Christians, Baptists, Methodists, and Catholics form the largest communities in the metropolitan area. A 2014 study determined the leading Baptist denomination was the Southern Baptist Convention. The United Methodist Church was the largest Methodist body and the Roman Catholic Diocese of Shreveport was the primary Catholic jurisdiction. The same study also named Islam the second-largest religion in the area, with Shreveporter Muslims making up about 14% of Louisiana's total Muslim-affiliated population. In a separate study by the Association of Religion Data Archives for 2020, the Southern Baptists had 111,745 members spread throughout 151 churches in the area; and the United Methodists had 19,114 members in 46 churches. Historically African American Christian denominations including the National Baptist Convention, National Baptist Convention of America, and National Missionary Baptist Convention had 32,132 members altogether.

Economy 

Shreveport–Bossier City is the economic and cultural center of Northwest Louisiana and the wider Ark-La-Tex tri-state region. It is also the largest economic metropolitan area in North Louisiana. The area's economic activity is centered in the city of Shreveport, the parish seat of Caddo Parish.

Much of the Shreveport–Bossier City metropolitan area's economy is based on oil and natural gas, manufacturing, casinos, restaurants, and commerce. The city of Shreveport was once a major player in the national oil industry. Standard Oil of Louisiana and United Gas Corporation were headquartered in the city until the 1960s and 1980s. Since the downturn in the oil industry, telecommunications, technology, banking, healthcare and medical research, and advertising have been rising industries since the early 2000s. Filming has also been a prevalent industry in the metropolitan area.

The largest companies operating within the metropolitan area are Amazon, Calumet Specialty Products Partners, SWEPCO, AT&T Mobility and Cricket Wireless, Louisiana State University, JPMorgan Chase, Regions Financial Corporation, Comcast, and Walmart. AT&T, Chase, and Regions have regional offices within Shreveport's downtown area. The Tyler, Texas-based Brookshire Grocery Company operates numerous Super 1 Foods and Brookshire's supermarkets in the area.

From 2013-2014, Greater Shreveport had a gross metropolitan product of nearly $23.6 billion and negative growth rate of 5.4 percent. Its gross metropolitan product had been declining since 2011 to a low of $19 billion in 2016. In 2018, its gross metropolitan product rebounded to $23.7 billion. Following statewide economic recovery trends, the Shreveport–Bossier City metropolitan area was expected to gain at least 5,000 jobs by the third quarter of 2021.

Media 
The principal cities of Shreveport and Bossier City have their own newspapers, The Shreveport Times and Bossier Press-Tribune, respectively. Other major publications in the metropolitan area include The Barksdale Warrior, The Shreveport Sun, Caddo Citizen, SB Magazine, The Forum Newsweekly, City Lights, The Inquisitor and The Shreveport Catalyst.

The central city of Shreveport is home to several radio stations, particularly KWKH and KEEL. The three commercial television outlets for the metropolis are KSLA (CBS), founded in 1954; KTBS-TV (ABC), founded in 1955; and KTAL-TV, which arrived in Shreveport in September 1961 as the NBC station. KTBS was an NBC station, with occasional ABC programs, from 1955–1961, when it switched affiliation to ABC. KTAL, formerly known as KCMC of Texarkana, was a CBS outlet prior to conversion to NBC, when it began to cover Shreveport as well as Texarkana.

Television

Radio 
AM stations

FM stations

Education 
The Shreveport–Bossier City area is home to several colleges: among them, the Methodist-affiliated Centenary College of Louisiana (originally founded in the East Feliciana Parish town of Jackson in 1825, eventually relocating to Shreveport in 1908), Louisiana Baptist University and Theological Seminary (founded in 1973), Louisiana State University Health Sciences Center Shreveport (opened in 1969 as the only medical school in northern Louisiana) and one of the largest nursing schools in northern Louisiana, the Northwestern State University College of Nursing (opened in 1949) as well as satellite campuses of Louisiana State University (opened as a two-year institution in 1967, and expanded into a four-year college in 1976), and Southern University (opened in 1967 with a two-year associate's degree program).

Transportation 
The Shreveport Regional Airport is the major airport for the metropolitan region. Interstate 20 and Interstate 49 are also major highways connecting the metro area to others including the DFW metroplex in Texas and Tyler, Texas.

See also 
Louisiana census statistical areas
List of census-designated places in Louisiana
List of cities, towns, and villages in Louisiana
List of metropolitan areas of Louisiana

References 

 
Geography of Bossier Parish, Louisiana
Geography of Caddo Parish, Louisiana
Geography of DeSoto Parish, Louisiana